Paul James is an American actor, best known for his role of Calvin on the ABC Family television show Greek. James also starred in the movie The Architect. James graduated from Syracuse University with a BA degree in Theatre. He also starred as Sean Egan on the Hulu TV series The Path.

Early life and education
James was born in Washington, D.C. and raised in the neighboring suburbs of Maryland. He graduated from Quince Orchard High School in Gaithersburg, Maryland. His mother was a school teacher at Watkins Mill High School in Gaithersburg, Maryland up until 2007.

Career
James starred on ABC Family's Greek, which aired for four seasons. In the show James plays Calvin Owens, a gay member of Omega Chi Delta fraternity. Fans have applauded both the show for portraying homosexuality in a good light and Paul James as an actor for his portrayal of a black gay man living in a fraternity house.

Filmography

Awards

References

External links

Male actors from Washington, D.C.
African-American male actors
American male television actors
Living people
People from Gaithersburg, Maryland
Syracuse University alumni
Year of birth missing (living people)
Male actors from Maryland
Montgomery College alumni
21st-century African-American people